Riding Mountain Broadcasting Ltd is a communication company based in Brandon, Manitoba. The company runs two radio stations: CKLQ (880 Q Country) and CKLF-FM (94.7 Star FM). Both stations are located at 624 14th Street East, on Brandon's southeast side.

Riding Mountain Broadcasting started in 1977 with CKLQ. The original CKLQ was broadcast on the frequency 1570 AM with a power of 1,000 watts. In 1985, CKLQ switched to the 880 AM frequency and increased its power to 10,000 watts.

In 2000, Riding Mountain Broadcasting created a second radio station, CKLF-FM, on the frequency 94.7 FM with a power of 100,000 watts.

In 2003, Riding Mountain Broadcasting became a subsidiary of Westman Communications Group.

References

External links
Westman Communications Group
 880 Q Country (CKLQ)
 94.7 Star FM (CKLF)

Radio broadcasting companies of Canada
Companies based in Brandon, Manitoba
Media cooperatives in Canada